Polygrammodes hercules is a moth in the family Crambidae. It was described by Cajetan Felder, Rudolf Felder and Alois Friedrich Rogenhofer in 1875. It is found in Colombia and Costa Rica.

References

Spilomelinae
Moths described in 1875
Moths of Central America
Moths of South America